Rick Simpson is an American set decorator. He won an Academy Award and was nominated for another in the category Best Art Direction.

Awards
Simpson won an Academy Award for Best Art Direction and was nominated for another:
Won
 Dick Tracy (1990)
Nominated
 2010 (1984)

Selected filmography

 Silent Movie (1976)
 Capricorn One (1977)
 Coma (1978)
 The Champ (1979)
 Personal Best (1982)
 Something Wicked This Way Comes (1983)
 The Star Chamber (1983)
 2010: The Year We Make Contact (1984)
 Johnny Dangerously (1984)
 Project X (1987)
 Tequila Sunrise (1988)
 Dick Tracy (1990)
 Predator 2 (1990)
 City Slickers (1991)
 Born Yesterday (1993)
 What's Love Got to Do with It (1993)
 The Pelican Brief (1993)
 Boys on the Side (1995)
 Casino (1995)
 Sgt. Bilko (1996)
 Bulworth (1998)
 Armageddon (1998)
 Little Nicky (2000)
 Rush Hour 2 (2001)
 The Hunted (2003)
 2 Fast 2 Furious (2003)
 Rules of Engagement (2000)
 The Black Dahlia (2006)

References

External links

Living people
American set decorators
Best Art Direction Academy Award winners
Year of birth missing (living people)
20th-century births